Picchio ("woodpecker" in Italian) may refer to:

 Procaer Picchio
 Picchio Racing Cars

People with the surname
 Ana María Picchio (born 1946), Argentine actress

People with the nickname
 Giancarlo De Sisti (born 1943), Italian footballer and manager

Italian-language surnames